Li Zhijian (1928–2011) was a Chinese physicist. He was a pioneer of Chinese microelectronics. He was former Chief Director of the Institute of Microelectronics, Tsinghua University; and the ex-Chairman of the Academic Committee, School of Information Science and Technology, Tsinghua University.

Life
Li was born on 1 May 1928, in Ningbo, Zhejiang Province. In 1951, he graduated from the Department of Physics, Zhejiang University in Hangzhou with a bachelor's degree. He went to study mathematics and physics in the USSR and was awarded a Science Doctorand by the USSR National University of Leningrad (now known as St. Petersburg State University, Russia).

Li later became a professor of Tsinghua University and held the chief-director position of the institute of Microelectronics for a long period. He was the chairman of the Academic Committee of the Information Science and Technology School, Tsinghua University.
He was also Vice-president of the Institute of Electronics, Chinese Academy of Science; and the Vice-chairman of the Chinese semiconductor and Integrated Circuits Technology Association.

Li was active at many international academic meetings, serving many times as the meeting-president, member of meeting commission in many international conferences including  the International Conference on Solid State Device and Integrated Circuit Technology (ICSICT; 93, 95), Solid State Material and Device Meeting (SSDM; 95, 96, 97, 98) and IEEE Regional Conferences.

Death
Li died of illness in Beijing at 4:30 pm on 2May 2011.

Positions
 1999–, Member, Third World Academy of Sciences 
 1991–, Academician, Chinese Academy of Sciences
 Chief Director, Institute of Microelectronics, Tsinghua University
 Chairman of the Academic Committee, School of Information Science and Technology, Tsinghua University
 Vice-president, Institute of Electronics, Chinese Academy of Science
 Vice-chairman, Chinese semiconductor and Integrated Circuits Technology Association
 Member, Editorial Board, Electronic Sinica

References

External links
 China Vitae – Li Zhijian 
 Li's CV at Tsinghua University 
 Li's biography in the Institute of Microelectronics, Tsinghua University 
 Li Zhijian in the Holeung Ho Lee Foundation

1928 births
2011 deaths
Chinese expatriates in the Soviet Union
Educators from Ningbo
Members of the Chinese Academy of Sciences
Physicists from Zhejiang
Saint Petersburg State University alumni
Scientists from Ningbo
Academic staff of Tongji University
Academic staff of Tsinghua University
Zhejiang University alumni